Bailey Island is an island in the U.S. state of South Carolina.

Bailey Island has the name of Dr. Ephraim Bailey and family, original owners of the site. A variant name is "Baileys Island".

References

Landforms of Charleston County, South Carolina
Islands of South Carolina